Cheyyar Polytechnic College (CPTC)  is a Diploma College in the Tiruvannamalai District near Cheyyar Town in the Tamil Nadu state of South India.

Colleges in Tamil Nadu
Education in Tiruvannamalai district
Cheyyar